Derby Day is a 1952 British drama film directed by Herbert Wilcox and starring Anna Neagle, Michael Wilding, Googie Withers, John McCallum, Peter Graves, Suzanne Cloutier and Gordon Harker. An ensemble piece, it portrays several characters on their way to the Derby Day races at Epsom Downs Racecourse. It was an attempt to revive the success that Neagle and Wilding had previously enjoyed on screen together. To promote the film, Wilcox arranged for Neagle to launch the film at the 1952 Epsom Derby. In the United States, the film was released as Four Against Fate.

While making the film, Wilding began dating Elizabeth Taylor, who was in London filming Ivanhoe, and later became her second husband.

Plot
On the morning of the Epsom Derby, a disparate group of people prepare to go to the races. Lady Helen Forbes, a recently widowed aristocrat, is planning to make the journey in spite of the disapproval of her social set who consider it unseemly to go while still in mourning. David Scott, a newspaper cartoonist, is ordered to go by his editor against his wishes. As part of a charity raffle, dissolute film star Gerald Berkeley must reluctantly escort a wealthy grand dame to Epsom. When the woman falls and injures her leg, her crafty housekeeper arranges for one of the young French maids to go in her place.

In Hackney, a lodger kills a man whose wife he has been having an affair with. The lodger and the wife plan to flee the country and travel to Epsom, where he knows a tipster who may be able to smuggle them out.

Helen and David meet and find themselves sharing confidences, as they were both bereaved in the same air crash. It seems likely that they will meet again. The lodger and the wife are spotted and arrested. A taxi driver's wife fulfils her life ambition to see the races.

Cast

 Anna Neagle as Lady Helen Forbes 
 Michael Wilding as David Scott - the cartoonist 
 Googie Withers as Betty Molloy 
 John McCallum as Tommy Dillon 
 Peter Graves as Gerald Berkeley - film star 
 Suzanne Cloutier as Michele Jolivet 
 Gordon Harker as Joe Jenkins 
 Edwin Styles as Sir George Forbes 
 Gladys Henson as Gladys Jenkins 
 Nigel Stock as Jim Molloy 
 Ralph Reader as Bill Hammond 
 Tom Walls Jr. as Gilpin 
 Josephine Fitzgerald as O'Shaughnessy - the cook 
 Alfie Bass as Spider Wilkes 
 Toni Edgar-Bruce as Mrs. Harbottle-Smith 
 Ewan Roberts as Jock, the Studio driver 
 Leslie Weston as Capt. Goggs 
 Sam Kydd as Harry Bunn - the bookie 
 Brian Johnston as Interviewer
 Richard Wattis as Newspaper editor
 Frank Webster as Taxi driver
 Gerald Anderson as Police Sergeant 
 Robert Brown as  Foster - Berkeley's Butler 
 John Chandos as man on Train 
 Cyril Conway as Hinchcliffe - Coalman 
 Arthur Hambling as Col. Tremaine 
 H.R. Hignett as Lawson - Lady Forbes' Butler 
 Prince Monolulu as himself 
 Myrette Morven as Mrs. Tremaine 
 Hugh Moxey as Police Constable 
 Jan Pilbeam as 1st Maid 
 Mary Gillingham as  2nd Maid 
 Derek Prentice as  Old Man 
 Michael Ripper as 1st Newspaper Reporter 
 Philip Ray as 2nd Newspaper Reporter 
 Cecily Walper as Mrs. Wickham - Housekeeper

References

Bibliography
 Harper, Sue & Porter, Vincent. British Cinema of the 1950s: The Decline of Deference. Oxford University Press, 2007.
 Mayer, Geoff. Guide to British cinema. Greenwood Publishing, 2003.
 Walker, Alexander. Elizabeth. Orion, 1997.

External links

1952 films
British black-and-white films
British drama films
Films directed by Herbert Wilcox
British horse racing films
1952 drama films
1950s English-language films
1950s British films